José Carlos Tabares (born 28 May 1978) is an Argentine professional footballer who plays for Spanish club CD Burriana as a striker.

Football career
Born in San Gustavo, Entre Ríos Province, Tabares started playing professionally with Comisión de Actividades Infantiles, serving a loan with Club Necaxa in the Liga MX during the 2003 Apertura and 2004 Clausura tournaments. He returned to Argentina to play for Arsenal de Sarandí in 2005, making his debut in the Primera División at the age of 27.

Tabares moved to Spain in January 2006, joining Segunda División club CD Castellón and scoring 20 league goals in his first two full seasons combined. After four years with the team, being reunited with compatriot Leonardo Ulloa in his final two and suffering relegation in his last, he returned to his country and signed for Primera B Nacional side Chacarita Juniors.

References

External links
 Argentine League statistics  
 
 
 
 
 

1978 births
Living people
Sportspeople from Entre Ríos Province
Association football forwards
Argentine footballers
Argentine Primera División players
Primera Nacional players
Club Atlético Patronato footballers
Comisión de Actividades Infantiles footballers
Arsenal de Sarandí footballers
Chacarita Juniors footballers
Liga MX players
Club Necaxa footballers
Segunda División players
Tercera División players
CD Castellón footballers
CD Eldense footballers
Primera B de Chile players
Rangers de Talca footballers
Argentine expatriate footballers
Expatriate footballers in Mexico
Expatriate footballers in Spain
Expatriate footballers in Chile
Argentine expatriate sportspeople in Spain